(born March 2, 1962, Hyōgo Prefecture, Japan) is a Japanese science fiction novelist.

Biography 
In 1992, his first novel Yume no Ki ga Tsugeta nara ("If Only the Dream Trees Could Touch") appeared in Hayakawa Publishing's S-F Magazine. His short story "Spice" won the Hayakawa Award in 1993.

In 1996, he published his first long novel in three volumes, Seikai no Monshou (Seikai no Monshō/Crest of the Stars). In the next year 1997 Seikai no Monsho was awarded with
Seiun Award at the Japan SF Convention. He released its sequel Seikai no Senki (Banner of the Stars), where he said that Seikai no Monsho was actually an overture to Seikai no Senki. Morioka had already suggested in Seikai no Monshou 2 that the entire series should narrate the life of Princess Lamhirh (aka Lafiel), from her birth to her eventual ascension to the imperial throne. Five volumes of Seikai no Senki are now available, with Morioka naming the first three the "Diahoc Trilogy", but the series itself has not yet finished.  An English translation of "Seikai no Monshō/Crest of the Stars" has been published by Tokyopop, which came out from the fall of 2006 to May 2007.

Aside from the Seikai series, he published another Senki in 4 volumes, based on Japanese mythology, as well as a two-volume series, Seikai no Danshō (Fragments of the Stars), a collection of stories set in the same universe as the other two series.

His characteristics as a writer include a deep interest for linguistics (especially for conlangs), artificial intelligence, bitter humor, and well-designed world settings.

Bibliography 
 (1997)
 (1999)
 (2009)
 (2011)
 (2014)

Series

 (1996)
 (1996)
 (1996)

 (1996)
 (1998)
 (2001)
 (2004)
 (2013)
 (2018)

 (2005)
 (2007)
 (2014)

Series
 (1999)
 (2001)
 (2002)
 (2004)

Series
 (2005)
 (2008)
 (2012)

Awards
Hayakawa Award (1993)
Seiun Award (1997)
Nihon SF Taisho Award (2015)

Notes and references

External links 
 Science Fiction & Fantasy Writers of Japan Profile 
 Eastern standard profile page
 Anime on DVD Interview at Anime Expo 2002
Entry in  The Encyclopedia of Science Fiction

1962 births
Constructed language creators
Living people
20th-century Japanese novelists
21st-century Japanese novelists
Japanese science fiction writers
People from Kobe